Ashina Shibobi (born 602, Old Turkic regnal name: 𐱅𐰇𐰠𐰾𐰴𐰍𐰣, Töles qaγan) — was a lesser khagan (or Qaghan equivalent to Emperor), who ruled the eastern wing of Eastern Turkic Khaganate.

Early life 
Ashina Shibobi was born to Shibi Qaghan. Shibobi created Nipu shad by Chuluo Qaghan and Tolis khagan by Illig Qaghan.

Career 
After the downfall of the Sui Dynasty, Ashina Shibobi joined his uncle, Illig Qaghan's raids against Tang. On the 12th of August 624, their armies clashed West of Binzhou. Taizong then went to Shibobi to seek a peace deal.

In 628, Kumo Xi tribes rose in rebellion against Tujue. Shibobi was unsuccessful in defeating the rebels, which made the khagan angry. After Yukuk Shad was defeated by Huige chief Yaoluge Pusa, Shibobi was ordered to pursue and defeat Yaoluge Pusa, but in late April, he was defeated. Illig ordered him to be flogged and imprisoned for 10 days. Taizong used this opportunity to encourage Shibobi to flee to Tang.

On 21 April 628, Shibobi asked Taizong to help him fight Illig. In December of the following year, Shibobi fully submitted to Tang and was given 700 families as a reward to serves as general in the dynasty. He died on his way to Changan, near Bingzhou.

Family 
He married Princess Huainan (淮南公主), daughter of Emperor Yang of Sui.

References 

Ashina house of the Turkic Empire
7th-century Turkic people